The Nysa Mała ("Little Neisse") is a river in Poland that is about 19 kilometres long, and is a left tributary of the Raging Neisse.

In the area of the foothills of the Sudetes it flows through the Chełmy Landscape Park.

The Little Neisse flows for much of its course through deciduous forests.

The entire course of the river is located south of Jawor, and north of Bolków and runs from west to east.

Between Gniewków and Czernica, the Little Neisse discharges into the Raging Neisse, the largest and most important tributary of the Kaczawa.

See also 
 Rivers of Poland

References

Bibliography 
 Słownik geografii turystycznej Sudetów, Volume 7  Kaczawskie , ed. Marek Staffa, Publisher I-BiS, Wroclaw, 2002, 

Rivers of Poland
Rivers of Lower Silesian Voivodeship